Hermann Dingler (23 May 1846 – 30 December 1935) was a German physician and botanist. He was a son-in-law of chemist Emil Erlenmeyer and the father of philosopher Hugo Dingler.

Dingler was born in Zweibrücken. He studied medicine at the universities of Zürich, Erlangen, Vienna and Munich, then participated in a botanical study trip to Palestine and Asia Minor. Afterwards, he spent a few years working as a military and railway physician in the Turkish service. In 1883 he obtained his habilitation at Munich, then from 1889 to 1910, he taught classes in botany at the Forestry University in Aschaffenburg.

While an instructor at Aschaffenburg and afterwards, he conducted lengthy research trips to Asia Minor (1892), Ceylon (1909), Sicily (1912) and the Caucasus (1914). In 1907 he founded a district committee for nature conservation in western Lower Franconia — his main focus was towards the establishment of a reserve for oak trees in Spessart. From 1906 onward, he published several works associated with the genus Rosa (roses). He died in Aschaffenburg, aged 89.

Selected works 
 Ueber das scheitelwachsthum des gymnospermenstammes, 1882.
 Die flachsprosse der phanerogamen, Vergleichend morphologisch-anatomische Studien, 1885.
 Die bewegung der pflanzlichen flugorgane; ein beitrag zur physiologie der passiven bewegungen im pflanzenreich, 1889.
 Ueber asymmetrie in der drüsenanordnung und rotfärbung bei den fiederblättchen mancher rosen, 1906.

References 

1846 births
1935 deaths
People from Zweibrücken
Ludwig Maximilian University of Munich alumni
20th-century  German botanists
19th-century German botanists
Travelers in Asia Minor